The 2016–17 Men's FIH Hockey World League Semifinals were the third stage of the 2016–17 edition of the Men's FIH Hockey World League. It took place in June and July 2017. A total of 20 teams competed in 2 events in this round of the tournament playing for 7 berths in the Final, to be played between 2 and 10 December 2017 in Bhubaneswar, India.

This round also served as a qualifier for the 2018 Men's Hockey World Cup as the 10/11 highest placed teams apart from the host nation and the five continental champions qualified.

Qualification
11 teams ranked between 1st and 11th in the FIH World Rankings current at the time of seeking entries for the competition qualified automatically, in addition to 8 teams qualified from Round 2 and one nation that did not meet ranking criteria and was exempt from Round 2 to host a Semifinal. The following twenty teams, shown with final pre-tournament rankings, competed in this round of the tournament.

London

All times are local (UTC+1).

First round

Pool A

Pool B

Second round

Quarter-finals

Ninth and tenth place

Fifth to eighth place classification

Crossover

Seventh and eighth place

Fifth and sixth place

First to fourth place classification

Semi-finals

Third and fourth place

Final

Awards

Johannesburg

All times are local (UTC+2).

First round

Pool A

Pool B

Second round

Quarter-finals

Ninth and tenth place

Fifth to eighth place classification

Crossover

Seventh and eighth place

Fifth and sixth place

First to fourth place classification

Semi-finals

Third and fourth place

Final

Awards

Final rankings
Qualification for 2018 Hockey World Cup

 Host nation and continental champion
 Continental champions
 Qualified through FIH Hockey World League

References

External links
Official website (London)
Official website (Johannesburg)

Men's Hockey World Cup qualifiers
Semifinals
International field hockey competitions hosted by England
International field hockey competitions hosted by South Africa
Hockey World League Semifinalsalifier